Pope John Paul II College of Education is a private educational institution owned by the Roman Catholic Archdiocese of Pondicherry and Cuddalore. The college is governed by the board of directors of Archdiocese of Pondicherry and Cuddalore (Le Conseil d'Administration de l'Archidiocèse de Pondicherry).

The institution is affiliated to Pondicherry University (Central University) and is the only institution accredited with A by NAAC in Puducherry.

Courses

Bachelor of Education

Subjects:
 Social studies	
 Mathematics	
 Physical science	
 Biological science	
 French	
 Tamil	
 English
 BCA & MCA (Master of Computer Applications)

Integrated Courses:
 B.A., B.Ed., English	
 B.Sc., B.Ed., Mathematics	
 B.Sc., B.Ed., Computer Science
 B.Sc., B.Ed., Physics
 B.Sc., B.Ed., Chemistry

References 

Catholic universities and colleges in India
Universities and colleges in Pondicherry (city)
Colleges of education in India
1986 establishments in Pondicherry
Educational institutions established in 1986